Gyzyljar Sanctuary is a sanctuary (zakaznik) of Turkmenistan.

It is part of Bathyz Nature Reserve. It was established as a place for foaling and lambing of animals.

External links
 https://web.archive.org/web/20090609072344/http://natureprotection.gov.tm/reserve_tm.html
 https://whc.unesco.org/en/tentativelists/5432/

Sanctuaries in Turkmenistan